Race Driver 2006 is a racing video game developed by Sumo Digital and published by Codemasters exclusively for PlayStation Portable. It is an expanded version of TOCA Race Driver 2.

Features
 Featuring 15 different motorsports—including:
 GT Sports Car Racing
 Street Racing
 Rally
 DTM
 V8 Supercars
 Global GT Lights
 Rally Cross
 Formula Ford
 Open Wheel Grand Prix
 Classic Car Racing
 Super Truck Racing
 Stock Car Oval Racing
 Ice Racing
 Convertible Racing
 and Performance Cars
 30 different global championships
 More than 50 cars and over 60 circuits
 The game displays up to 21 cars racing on track simultaneously
 Multiplayer mode with the ability to race with 12 players simultaneously

Reception

The game was met with positive reception upon release.  It has a score of 81% and 81 out of 100 from GameRankings and Metacritic.

It was given IGN's awards for Best PSP Racing Game and Best PSP Simulation of 2006.

References

External links
 Official Site

2006 video games
Codemasters games
North America-exclusive video games
PlayStation Portable games
PlayStation Portable-only games
Racing video games
Sumo Digital games
Video games developed in the United Kingdom